The 1956 Divizia B was the 17th season of the second tier of the Romanian football league system.

The format has been changed back to two series, one of them having 13 teams and the other one 14. At the end of the season the winners of the series promoted to Divizia A, the last two places from each series relegated to Divizia C. This was the seventh and the last season played in the spring-autumn system, a system imposed by the new leadership of the country which were in close ties with the Soviet Union.

Team changes

To Divizia B
Promoted from District Championship
 —

Relegated from Divizia A
 Locomotiva Târgu Mureș
 Locomotiva Constanța
 Avântul Reghin

From Divizia B
Relegated to Divizia C
 Flamura Roșie Sfântu Gheorghe
 Flamura Roșie Cluj
 Flamura Roșie Buhuși
 Locomotiva Craiova
 Metalul Baia Mare
 Avântul Fălticeni
 Știința Craiova
 Metalul Oradea
 Dinamo Galați
 Metalul București
 Metalul 108 Cugir
 Locomotiva Galați
 Metalul Arad

Promoted to Divizia A
 Locomotiva GR București
 Progresul Oradea
 Dinamo Bacău

Renamed teams 
Flacăra 1 Mai Ploiești was renamed as Energia 1 Mai Ploiești.

Flacăra Câmpina was renamed as Energia Câmpina.

Flacăra Mediaș was renamed as Energia Mediaș.

Locomotiva Târgu Mureș was renamed as Recolta Târgu Mureș.

Metalul Câmpia Turzii was renamed as Energia Câmpia Turzii.

Metalul Hunedoara was renamed as Energia Hunedoara.

League tables

Serie I

Serie II

See also 

 1956 Divizia A

References

Liga II seasons
Romania
Romania
2
2